Barbing is a municipality in the district of Regensburg in Bavaria in Germany. It lies on the Danube river.

The town is home to the luxury watchmaker, Damasko.

Subdivisions
Barbing has eleven Ortsteile:
 Altach
 Auburg
 Auhof
 Barbing
 Eltheim
 Friesheim
 Illkofen
 Mooshof
 Naßenhart
 Sarching
 Unterheising

References

Regensburg (district)
Populated places on the Danube